Supreme may refer to:

Entertainment
 Supreme (character), a comic book superhero 
 Supreme (film), a 2016 Telugu film
 Supreme (producer), hip-hop record producer
 "Supreme" (song), a 2000 song by Robbie Williams
 The Supremes, Motown-era singer group
 Supreme Pictures Corporation, 1930s film company

Other
 Supreme (brand), a clothing brand based in New York
 Supreme (cookery), a term used in cookery
 Supreme, Louisiana, a census-designated place in the United States
 Supreme Soviet, the highest legislation body of Soviet Union, dissolved in 1991
 Oldsmobile Cutlass Supreme, car produced by Oldsmobile between 1966 and 1997
 Plaxton Supreme, British coach bodywork built in the late 1970s and early 1980s

See also
 Supreme Records (disambiguation), several record labels
 Supremo (disambiguation)
 Supreme court